The 2021 Scheldeprijs was the 109th edition of the Scheldeprijs road cycling one day race, which was held on 7 April 2021. It was a 1.Pro event on the 2021 UCI Europe Tour and the 2021 UCI ProSeries.

The Scheldeprijs is known as a race that particularly suits the sprinters as it includes several cobbled roads but no significant climbs. Defending champion Caleb Ewan chose not to participate as he chose to rest to be able to participate in all three Grand Tours in 2021. Arnaud Démare would have started, but his team  backed out on last instance due to a positive COVID-19 test within the team. As a result, the main pre-race favorites were Sam Bennett, Tim Merlier, Pascal Ackermann, Giacomo Nizzolo, Cees Bol, Elia Viviani and previous winner Alexander Kristoff. Three-time winner Mark Cavendish was also taking part, although it was assumed his team would aim for Bennett to win the race.

Following a breakaway by a group of 31 riders, the sprint was won by Jasper Philipsen in a group sprint which included most of the pre-race favorites. This marked the first time in 15 years the race was won by a Belgian rider, when Tom Boonen won the 2006 edition.

Teams 
Eleven of the nineteen UCI WorldTeams, nine UCI ProTeams, and two UCI Continental teams made up the twenty-two teams that participated in the race. However,  voluntarily withdrew 'as a precautionary measure' following positive COVID-19 test results from several staff members, which had forced them to miss two races in the two weeks prior to the race. Meanwhile,  were a late scratch, after they received a positive COVID-19 test within the team on the day of the race.  imposed a self-suspension on racing after one of their riders received a positive anti-doping test. All but two teams entered seven riders;  and  each entered six. Three more non-starters reduced the starting field to 152 riders, of which only 77 finished.

UCI WorldTeams

 
 
 
 
 
 
 
 
 
 
 
 
 

UCI ProTeams

 
 
 
 
 
 
 
 
 
 

UCI Continental Teams

Race summary
Due to strong winds and some crashes, the peloton split into echelons early on, with 14 riders in the lead group being chased by a slightly bigger group of riders in a second group and the rest of the bunch about two minutes down. The two groups in front eventually merged and included most of the sprinters on board, with the most notable absentees Elia Viviani and Timothy Dupont, causing their teams ( & ) to lead the chase in the peloton. The peloton would however never return to the front, with the gap staying above 1 minute until the finish. The group consisted of Ackermann, Marcus Burghardt, Nils Politt, Michael Schwarzmann & Rüdiger Selig, Bennett, Cavendish, Michael Mørkøv, Florian Sénéchal & Bert Van Lerberghe, Dries De Bondt, Philipsen & Jonas Rickaert, Luuc Bugter, Piotr Havik & Jan-Willem van Schip, Stan Dewulf & Marc Sarreau, Jonas Koch & Danny van Poppel, Giacomo Nizzolo & Max Walscheid, Clément Russo, Dries Van Gestel, Cees Bol, Søren Wærenskjold, Brent Van Moer, Norman Vahtra, Evaldas Šiškevičius and Luca Mozzato.

No real attacks came from the group, which thus led to a group sprint. There seemed to be some confusion at  whether to opt for Bennett or Cavendish to prepare the lead out for and when a strong  train passed them it was Jasper Philipsen who was able to win the sprint comfortably with teammates Bennett and Cavendish both on the podium beside him.

Result

References

External links 

2021
Scheldeprijs
Scheldeprijs
Scheldeprijs
Scheldeprijs
Scheldeprijs
Scheldeprijs